Liliomfi is a 1954 Hungarian romantic comedy film directed by Károly Makk. It was entered into the 1955 Cannes Film Festival.

Cast
 Iván Darvas - Liliomfi
 Marianne Krencsey - Mariska
 Margit Dajka - Camilla
 Samu Balázs - Szilvay professzor
 Éva Ruttkai - Erzsi
 Imre Soós - Gyuri
 Sándor Pécsi - Szellemfi
 Sándor Tompa - Kányai
 Vera Szemere - Zengőbércziné
 Dezső Garas - Ifjú Schnaps
 Gábor Rajnay -Pejachevich gróf

References

External links

1954 films
Hungarian romantic comedy films
1950s Hungarian-language films
1954 romantic comedy films
Films directed by Károly Makk
Films set in Lake Balaton
Hungarian black-and-white films